The Xlinks Morocco-UK Power Project is a proposal to create 10.5 GW of renewable generation, 20 GWh of battery storage and a 3.6GW high-voltage direct current interconnector to carry solar and wind-generated electricity from the Kingdom of Morocco to the United Kingdom. Morocco has far more consistent weather, and so should provide consistent solar power even in midwinter.

If built, the  cable will be the longest undersea power cable by far, and would supply up to 7.5% of the UK's electricity consumption.

Current status
As of May 2022, Xlinks had secured "up to" £40million in development funding for the project, and it was reported to be close to appointing bankers to help raise the billions of pounds of investment funding required.

Sky Business News reports that the company has "held extensive discussions with the [UK] government about its plans, which are drawing particular interest in Whitehall".

Power generation
The planned total generating capacity is a nominal 10.5GW.

Location

The wind and solar farms will be located in the Guelmim-Oued Noun region of Morocco. The region has excellent generating characteristics: 
 The desert location has sunshine with the third highest Global Horizontal Irradiance (GHI) in North Africa.
 The consistently strong winds blow from the North and North-West. Mountain ranges inland from the coast concentrate the wind and enjoy some of the highest onshore wind  power densities in Africa.

Daily consistency
The PV component will generate electricity during daylight hours, and the PV panels will move to track the sun to increase output in the morning and the evening. In Morocco, the prevailing winds blow most strongly in the afternoon and early evening, driven by the temperature difference between the Sahara Desert and the cooler Atlantic Ocean. These generating characteristics, combined with battery back-up, should allow the cable to run at full capacity for approximately 20 out of each 24hours in the day.

Seasonal consistency
Because of the intense year-round sunshine, solar panels are expected to produce three times more energy than they would in the UK. The panels will generate throughout the year, including the winter months when, in Britain, sunshire is scarce and the days are short. The reliable prevailing winds will generate power consistently, even at times of low winds in Europe.

Interconnector cable

Route
If built, the undersea cable will run from landfall near Tan-Tan in southern Morocco to National Grid connection points at Alverdiscott near the north coast of Devon, England. 

Following the continental shelf is longer than the direct route, but is less technically challenging and avoids the abyssal depths of the Bay of Biscay.

The cable route passes Spain, Portugal and France, but is not planned to have any electrical connection to these countries. This will massively simplify obtaining permits from those countries.

Technical specification
The 3.6GW interconnector is planned to consist of two independent 1.8GW circuits, each with separate positive and negative cables.

Manufacture
Xlinks proposes to manufacture the submarine power cables through a separately financed subsidiary, XLCC, and has  secured manufacturing sites in Hunterston, Scotland, on Teesside and at Port Talbot in Wales, which are now "under development". As of November 2021, production is planned to start in 2024, and it will take four years to produce the cables required by the project.

Project promoter
The project developer, XLinks Ltd., is a start up, and this is its first project, but according to the Business editor of Sky News it does have a "heavyweight board".

 Its UK Executive chairman is former Tesco chief executive Sir Dave Lewis.
 The founder and CEO is Simon Morrish, who is a serial entrepreneur and provided most of the £30M seed funding.
 Xlinks has received the support of several "major energy sector names", including Paddy Padmanathan, CEO and president of ACWA Power, Yoav Zingher, former CEO of KiWi Power and Kevin Sara, chairman and CEO of Nur Energie.
 Sir Ian Davis, former chairman of Rolls-Royce Holdings, has also been recruited as a non-executive director.

Project economics
The cost is estimated at £16bn, of which half will be for the interconnector cabling.

Though transmission losses for such a long cable will be relatively high at 13%, 
power should be available even at times when neither solar nor wind power available in the UK, when prices will be higher. 

Xlink believe the project will be economically viable if they can secure contracts for difference to supply electricity at £48/MWh.

Project history
Xlinks, the project sponsor, was created in 2018. Xlinks Ltd. was incorporated in March 2019.

By October 2021, Xlinks had stated that they have reached agreement with National Grid plc for two 1.8GW HVDC connections to the GB National Grid in Devon.

In March 2022, Intertek completed a Permit Feasibility Study, which "outlines in detail the process Xlinks must follow to obtain the permits to survey the proposed route, install the cable system and complete the necessary maintenance throughout the project's operation life."

In March 2022, XLinks commissioned Intertek to provide Quality Assurance and technical advice on marine cable routing, survey specification and procurement.

In May 2022, Octopus Energy invested in the project.

See also
 Icelink
 North Sea Link
 Australia-Asia Power Link
 Desertec
 Spain-Morocco interconnection

References

External links
 Xlinks project page
 Summary of project, including map of proposed cable route
 Diagram of proposed route

Electrical interconnectors to and from Great Britain
Electrical interconnectors to and from the Synchronous Grid of Continental Europe
Proposed solar power stations
Proposed wind farms
Wind power in Morocco
Solar power in Morocco